Pearse Island is an island in western British Columbia, Canada, in the Portland Inlet, an inlet of the Pacific Ocean. The island was first charted in 1793 by George Vancouver during his 1791-95 expedition.

Location and territorial claims
It and neighbouring islands figured in one of the territorial and marine-boundary quarrels of the Alaska boundary dispute (the island was formerly claimed by the United States).

Features
The former Pearse Island Indian Reserve No. 43 is on the northeast end of the island.  It is now named Wil Milit as a result of the Nisga'a Treaty and is no longer an Indian Reserve, but is fee-simple.

Pearse Canal Island

See also
Hay-Herbert Treaty
Wales Island (British Columbia)

References

Islands of British Columbia
North Coast of British Columbia
Canada–United States border disputes